Verónica de Paoli (born 7 May 1973) is an Argentine hurdler. She competed in the women's 100 metres hurdles at the 2000 Summer Olympics.

References

1973 births
Living people
Athletes (track and field) at the 2000 Summer Olympics
Argentine female hurdlers
Olympic athletes of Argentina
Athletes (track and field) at the 1999 Pan American Games
Pan American Games competitors for Argentina
Place of birth missing (living people)